SWOP may refer to:
 Specifications for Web Offset Publications
 Sex Workers Outreach Project USA
 Significant Weather Observing Program